Trachyphloeini is a tribe of broad-nosed weevils in the beetle family Curculionidae. There are more than 25 genera in Trachyphloeini.

Genera
These 27 genera belong to the tribe Trachyphloeini:

 Archaeocallirhopalus Legalov, 2013 c g
 Atrachyphloeus Voss, 1962
 Cathormiocerus Schénherr, 1842 c g b
 Cercopedius Sleeper, 1955 i c g b
 Cercopeus Schönherr, 1842 i c g b
 Chaetechidius Sleeper, 1955 i c g b
 Epistomius Borovec & Skuhrovec, 2017 c
 Laohajekia Borovec, 2014 c g
 Nama Borovec & Meregalli, 2013 c g
 Pelletierellus Borovec, 2009 c g
 Pentatrachyphloeus Voss, 1974 c g
 Perarogula Hoffmann, 1963 c g
 Pseudocercopeus Sleeper, 1955 i c g b
 Pseudocneorhinus Roelofs, 1873 c g b
 Pseudotrachyphloeosoma Borovec, 2014 c g
 Rhinodontodes Voss, 1967 c g
 Rhinodontus Faust, 1890 c g
 Romualdius Borovec, 2009 c g
 Stuebenius Borovec, 2009 c g
 Timareta Pascoe, 1872 c g
 Tokara Morimoto, 2015
 Trachyodes Marshall, 1916 c g
 Trachyphilus Faust, 1887 c g
 Trachyphloeomimus Champion, 1911 c g
 Trachyphloeosoma Wollaston, 1869 i c g b
 Trachyphloeus Germar, 1817 i c g b
 Zarazagaia Borovec, 2009 c g

Data sources: i = ITIS, c = Catalogue of Life, g = GBIF, b = Bugguide.net

References

 Borovec, R. 2014: Study on Trachyphloeini of the Oriental Region (Coleoptera: Curculionidae: Entiminae). Studies and reports (taxonomical series), 10(1): 1-39. 
 Gistel, J. 1848: Faunula monacensis cantharologica. (Fortsetzung). Isis von Oken, 1848(7): second to fourth unnumbered pages in the Section Umschlag (front covers).
 Alonso-Zarazaga, M.A.; Lyal, C.H.C. 1999: A world catalogue of families and genera of Curculionoidea (Insecta: Coleoptera) (excepting Scolytidae and Platypodidae). Entomopraxis, Barcelona.

External links 

Entiminae